Nikola Tomašić (Hungarian: Miklós Tomassich or Miklós Tomasics; 13 January 1864 – 29 May 1918) was a Croatian politician, who served as ban (viceroy) of the Kingdom of Croatia-Slavonia. In 1903 he served as Minister without portfolio of Croatian Affairs.

References
 Magyar Életrajzi Lexikon

1864 births
1918 deaths
Politicians from Zagreb
Ministers of Croatian Affairs of Hungary
Bans of Croatia
Croatian Austro-Hungarians